Mae Ai is a tambon (subdistrict) of Mae Ai District, in Chiang Mai Province, Thailand. In 2014 it had a population of 9,699.

Administration

Central administration
The tambon is divided into 13 administrative villages (mubans).

Local administration
The area of the subdistrict is shared by two local governments.
 Sub-district municipality (thesaban tambon) Mae Ai (เทศบาลตำบลแม่อาย)
 sub-district administrative organization (SAO) Doi Lang (องค์การบริหารส่วนตำบลดอยลาง)

References

External links
Thaitambon.com on Mae Ai

Tambon of Chiang Mai province
Populated places in Chiang Mai province